Zakaria El Hachimi is a Moroccan professional footballer, who plays as a right back.

International career
In January 2014, coach Hassan Benabicha, invited him to be a part of the Moroccan squad for the 2014 African Nations Championship. He helped the team to top group B after drawing with Burkina Faso and Zimbabwe and defeating Uganda. The team was eliminated from the competition at the quarter final zone after losing to Nigeria.

References

External links
Zakaria El Hachimi at Footballdatabase

Living people
Moroccan footballers
2014 African Nations Championship players
1987 births
Wydad AC players
Raja CA players
Botola players
Morocco international footballers
Association football fullbacks
Morocco A' international footballers
2018 African Nations Championship players